The Office of the Vice President may refer to:

Office of the Vice President of the United States
Office of the Vice President of the Philippines
Office of the Vice-President (Zambia)